The South American Youth Football Championship, also known as U-20 South American Championship and , "Campeonato Sudamericano Sub 20" or  (English: "America's Youth") is a South American football tournament organized by the CONMEBOL for South American national teams of men under age of 20. This tournament also serves as qualification for the FIFA U-20 World Cup.

History 
The first South American Youth Championship was hosted by Venezuela from 22 March to 13 April 1954. Initially played as an under-19 tournament, it became an under-20 event from 1977. Brazil has won the tournament on the most occasions (12 times).

Format 
All matches take place in the host country, and all ten U-20 national football teams of CONMEBOL compete in every edition (if none of the associations withdraw). They are separated in two groups of five, and each team plays four matches in a pure round-robin stage. The three top competitors advance to a single final group of six, wherein each team plays five matches. The results in this last pure round-robin stage determines the champion and the South American qualification to the next FIFA U-20 World Cup. Unlike most international tournaments, in South American Youth Championships there is neither final match nor third place match nor knockout stages.

Results

Performances by countries

Top goalscorers

Source: RSSSF.

Men's U-20 World Cup Performances of Qualified South American teams
Legend
1st – Champions
2nd – Runners-up
3rd – Third place
4th – Fourth place
QF – Quarterfinals
R2 – Round 2
R1 – Round 1
     – Hosts
q – Qualified for upcoming tournament

See also
 South American U-17 Championship
 South American U-15 Championship

References

External links

 

 
Under-20 association football
CONMEBOL competitions
Football qualification for the Summer Olympics
Recurring sporting events established in 1954
1954 establishments in South America
South American youth sports competitions